Andrew Harvey is an American former Negro league shortstop who played in the 1930s.

Harvey made his Negro leagues debut in 1937 with the Philadelphia Stars, and briefly played with the club again the following season. In 29 recorded career games, he posted 26 hits and 13 RBI in 102 plate appearances.

References

External links
 and Seamheads

Year of birth missing
Place of birth missing
Philadelphia Stars players